Walter Goodale Morrill (November 13, 1840 – March 3, 1935) was a Union Army officer in the American Civil War and a recipient of the U.S. military's highest decoration, the Medal of Honor, for his actions at the Second Battle of Rappahannock Station in November 1863.  Also, Morrill's earlier actions in July 1863 at Gettysburg are considered essential for the famous Union victory on Little Round Top.

Morrill was raised in Williamsburg, Maine. In 1861 the age of 20, he enlisted as a sergeant in Company A, 6th Maine Volunteer Infantry Regiment. A year later he was commissioned as an officer in Company B, 20th Maine Volunteer Infantry Regiment. He was promoted several times, ultimately to lieutenant colonel. He mustered out on June 4, 1865. His Medal of Honor citation states:

At the action of Little Round Top Morrill led his unit at the decisive point of the bayonet charge without orders. His contingent created the impression of two regiments rushing through the woods, though it consisted only of 44 Company B soldiers and 14 U.S. Sharpshooters. It was Morrill's group of Union soldiers that Confederate Lt. Col. (later Brig. Gen.) William C. Oates believed caused panic in his Confederate soldiers. Without Morrill's sudden assault from the Confederates' right, Joshua Chamberlain's famous bayonet attack, often credited for saving Little Round Top and Gettysburg from defeat, probably would have been spoiled and pushed back by Oates men.

During their retreat, the Confederates were subjected to a volley of rifle fire from Company B of the 20th Maine, commanded by Morrill, and a few of the 2nd U.S. Sharpshooters, who had been placed by Chamberlain behind a stone wall 150 yards to the east, hoping to guard against an envelopment. This group, who had been hidden from sight, caused considerable confusion in the Confederate ranks.

Of Little Round Top, Brig. Gen. Oates said, 

From Colonel Chamberlain's after action report:: "Captain Morrill with his skirmishers (send out from my left flank), with some dozen or fifteen of the U.S. Sharpshooters who had put themselves under his (Morrill's) direction, fell upon the enemy as they were breaking, and by his demonstrations, as well as his well-directed fire, added much to the effect of the [bayonet] charge ... that cleared the front of nearly our entire brigade."

Morrill led troops in many other battles, including at Appomattox, and became a prominent businessman in Pittsfield, Maine after the war.

References

External links
 
 

1840 births
1935 deaths
People from Piscataquis County, Maine
Union Army officers
People of Maine in the American Civil War
United States Army Medal of Honor recipients
American Civil War recipients of the Medal of Honor
Burials in Maine